John Peake is a game designer who has worked primarily on board games.

Career
In early 1975, John Peake and his school friends – Ian Livingstone and Steve Jackson, who shared a flat in London's Shepherd's Bush with him – decided that they wanted to make games; they chose the name "Games Workshop" for their company because it reflected the fact that they would be crafting their games by hand. Peake was a craftsman and started out making backgammon games with inlaid mahogany and cherry veneer and soon expanded into crafting sets for mancala, nine men's morris, go, tower of Hanoi and other games. To support their newfound games business, Jackson, Livingstone and Peake started publishing a monthly newsletter, Owl and Weasel (1975–1977). In 1976, Peake, who had no interest in the new role-playing game industry, saw that Games Workshop was getting more involved with RPGs and decided to leave the company.

References

Board game designers
British retail company founders
Living people
Year of birth missing (living people)